The Mynde is a Grade I listed country house in the village of Much Dewchurch, Herefordshire, England which dates from the 15th century.

Originally constructed in the 15th and 16th century it was remodelled in the 18th century and recast in the 19th century by William Atkinson. Built of sandstone rubble and brick, it is stuccoed on three sides. It has a rectangular floor plan with rear projecting wings to the west and an east facing frontage and is built in 3 storeys with a hipped Welsh slate roof. The main front elevation has 9 bays, with the central five bays slightly projecting, with a porch flanked by Doric columns supporting an entablature.

It stands in a 1,180-acre estate and is approached along a mile-long private 'carriage drive' with views of the gardens, lake and the surrounding Herefordshire countryside.

History
The estate had descended in the Pye family since the Norman conquest and was their family seat in Tudor times. Amongst the Pye owners of the property were the lawyer and Elizabethan courtier Walter Pye I and the Royalist courtier Walter Pye II.

In 1709 the Duke of Chandos acquired the house and added the striking Kings Hall with plasterwork by Bugatti and Attari. 

In 1740 it was purchased by Richard Symons of London. He was succeeded by his only surviving child, Anna Sophia Symons, who married Richard Peers. On inheriting the estate, their son, also Richard Peers, M.P., adopted the name Symons, and was created a baronet in 1774, but died unmarried in 1796, after which the estate passed to his sister's grandson Thomas Raymond, who likewise adopted the Symons name and arms. The estate then descended in the direct male line of the Symons family to Thomas Edward Raymond Symons (d. 1928), on whose death it was sold to a fellow army officer, Henry Ambrose Clive, younger son of General Edward Henry Clive of Perrystone Court, Herefordshire. In 1959 the estate was bought by William Anthony Twiston-Davies (d. 1989); his son, Audley, completed a restoration of the main house between 1997 and 2001, and put the property on the market in 2013.

In 2016 the property was sold for £15m to Richard and Sarah Burt.

References

Grade I listed buildings in Herefordshire
Country houses in Herefordshire
Grade I listed houses